|}

The Matron Stakes is a Group 1 flat horse race in Ireland open to thoroughbred fillies and mares aged three years or older. It is run at Leopardstown over a distance of 1 mile (1,609 metres), and it is scheduled to take place each year in September.

History
The event was formerly known as the Gilltown Stud Stakes, and it used to be held at the Curragh. For a period it was classed at Group 3 level. It was renamed the Matron Stakes in the mid 1980s.

The race was transferred to Leopardstown in 2002. It was promoted to Group 2 status in 2003, and to Group 1 in 2004. It is now sponsored by Coolmore Stud, and its full title includes the name of Justify, a Coolmore stallion. In 2014 it was moved back a week in September to become part of a new Irish Champions Weekend fixture.

Records

Most successful horse since 1980:
 no horse has won this race more than once since 1980

Leading jockey since 1980 (3 wins):
 Johnny Murtagh – Timarida (1995), Soviet Song (2004), Lillie Langtry (2010)

Leading trainer since 1980 (4 wins):
 John Dunlop – Mary Mitsu (1982), Llyn Gwynant (1988), Cloud of Dust (1992), Iftiraas (2000)

Leading owner since 1986 (4 wins):
 Tabor / Derrick Smith / Magnier - Lillie Langtry (2010), Legatissimo (2015), Alice Springs (2016), Hydrangea (2017)

Winners since 1986

 Duntle finished first in 2012, but she was relegated to second place following a stewards' inquiry.

Earlier winners

 1980: Calandra
 1981: Tumblella
 1982: Mary Mitsu
 1983: Mighty Fly
 1984: Clare Bridge
 1985: Only

See also
 Horse racing in Ireland
 List of Irish flat horse races

References
 Paris-Turf: 
 Racing Post:

 galopp-sieger.de – Matron Stakes.
 horseracingintfed.com – International Federation of Horseracing Authorities – Matron Stakes (2018).
 irishracinggreats.com – Matron Stakes (Group 1).
 pedigreequery.com – Matron Stakes.

Flat races in Ireland
Mile category horse races for fillies and mares
Leopardstown Racecourse
Breeders' Cup Challenge series